Peter Binkovski (born 28 June 1972) is a retired Slovenian football midfielder, playing mainly for Maribor and the Slovenia national team before short spells in four other countries followed by a return clubs to his homeland. He was capped 16 times and scored one goal for Slovenia between 1994 and 1996.

Binkovski's father Boris was also a footballer.

See also
Slovenian international players
List of NK Maribor players

References

External links

Peter Binkovski at NZS 

1972 births
Living people
Slovenian footballers
Yugoslav footballers
Association football midfielders
Slovenian expatriate footballers
NK Maribor players
Slovenian PrvaLiga players
Östers IF players
Allsvenskan players
Vegalta Sendai players
Maccabi Jaffa F.C. players
NK Rudar Velenje players
NK Domžale players
NK Železničar Maribor players
Liga Leumit players
Expatriate footballers in Sweden
Expatriate footballers in Japan
Expatriate footballers in Israel
Expatriate footballers in Austria
Slovenian expatriate sportspeople in Sweden
Slovenian expatriate sportspeople in Japan
Slovenian expatriate sportspeople in Israel
Slovenian expatriate sportspeople in Austria
Slovenia under-21 international footballers
Slovenia international footballers
Competitors at the 1993 Mediterranean Games
Mediterranean Games competitors for Slovenia